Maria Bice Valori (13 May 1927 – 17 March 1980) was an Italian actress, comedian and television and radio personality.

Life and career
Born in Rome, Valori studied at the Silvio d’Amico Academy of Dramatic Arts, graduating in 1948.  The same year, she entered the stage company of the Piccolo Teatro of Rome directed by Orazio Costa. After playing in several classics, Valori specialized as a comedic actress, and had her main successes in the musical theatre genre, notably appearing in Rugantino and Aggiungi un posto a tavola. In films, she was a very active character actress, mainly cast in humorous roles.  Valori appeared often on television, as a comedian, a presenter and an actress in series and TV-movies of some success. She also had a consistent success on radio, in which she created the character of "Sora Bice", a shrewish RAI telephone operator.  Valori often shared the scene with her husband, the actor and comedian Paolo Panelli, whom she had married in 1952. Their daughter Alessandra is also an actress. Valori died in 1980, aged 52, as a result of a tumor.

Partial filmography

 His Last Twelve Hours (1950) - Un testimone dell'incidente
 Accidents to the Taxes!! (1951) - Allieva del collegio
 Toto the Third Man (1951) - Luisa - la moglie di Pietro
 Seven Hours of Trouble (1951) - Maddalena - la balia
 The Steamship Owner (1951) - Marga
 My Heart Sings (1951) - Liliana
 Deceit (1952) - Giustina
 Good Folk's Sunday (1953) - (uncredited)
 Siamo tutti inquilini (1953) - Una cameriera
 Marriage (1954) - Anna Snakina, l'ostetrica
 Papà Pacifico (1954) - Gina - the servant
 The Three Thieves (1954) - Amica di Doris
 The Belle of Rome (1955) - Suor Serafina
 La moglie è uguale per tutti (1955) - Giulietta's Sister
 Bravissimo (1955) - Soprano
 The Most Wonderful Moment (1957) - Carla
 Susanna Whipped Cream (1957) - Rossella
 Femmine tre volte (1957) - Katiuscia
 La zia d'America va a sciare (1957) - Faustina
 Maid, Thief and Guard (1958) - La contessa
 Le dritte (1958) - Edna Piselli
 Caporale di giornata (1958) - Gelsomina
 Mia nonna poliziotto (1958) - Francesca
 Le confident de ces dames (1959) - Lucienne
 Guardatele ma non toccatele (1959) - Irma, moglie di La Notte
 Tough Guys (1960) - Genzianetta
 Le signore (1960) - Nora
 Caccia al marito (1960) - Giuditta - the nursemaid
 Il carro armato dell'8 settembre (1960)
 Ferragosto in bikini (1960) - Gladys
 5 marines per 100 ragazze (1961) - La direttrice
 Hercules in the Valley of Woe (1961)
 Scandali al mare (1961) - Beatrice Garfano'
 Mariti a congresso (1961)
 Adultero lui, adultera lei (1963) - L'avvocato difensore
 Le motorizzate (1963) - Lola Rossi (segment "La Roulotte Squillo")
 Salad by the Roots (1964) - Tante Ophélie (uncredited)
 Amori pericolosi (1964) - La domestica (segment "Il generale")
 Oltraggio al pudore (1964)
 Le sedicenni (1965)
 Rita the Mosquito (1966) - Luigina, the school director
 The Taming of the Shrew (1967) - The Widow
 Be Sick... It's Free (1968) - Amelia-Doctor Bui's Wife
 Gli infermieri della mutua (1969) - Dr. Venanzi
 Il suo nome è Donna Rosa (1969) - Donna Rosa
 Lisa dagli occhi blu (1970) - Mamma Coco Prandi
 Mezzanotte d'amore (1970) - Donna Rosa

References

External links

 

1927 births
1980 deaths
Actresses from Rome
Italian film actresses
Accademia Nazionale di Arte Drammatica Silvio D'Amico alumni
20th-century Italian actresses
Italian stage actresses
Italian television actresses
Italian television presenters
Italian radio personalities
Italian women comedians
Deaths from cancer in Lazio
20th-century Italian comedians
Italian women television presenters
Burials at the Cimitero Flaminio